Below is a list of notable members of Delta Tau Delta fraternity.

Current government officials
Governors
 Texas Governor Greg Abbott

U.S. Senators
 Delaware Senator Thomas R. Carper

U.S. Representatives
 Ohio Representative Tim Ryan
 Virginia Representative Rob Wittman

Municipal
 Indianapolis, Indiana Mayor Greg Ballard
 Allen County, Indiana County Council Kyle Kerley

Former government officials

National

U.S. Vice Presidents
 Alben Barkley (1949-1953)
 Henry Agard Wallace (1941-1945)

U.S. Supreme Court
 William Brennan (1956-1990)
 Tom C. Clark (1949-1967)

Federal judges
 Carlos Bea, Ninth Circuit Judge, 2003–present
 John V. Singleton, (District Judge, 1966–1988)
 Henry Alvan Mentz, Jr., District Judge, Eastern District of Louisiana 1982–2001

U.S. Senate
 Kansas Governor and Senator Henry Justin Allen
 Connecticut Governor and Senator Raymond Baldwin
 Colorado Senator Hank Brown
 Indiana Senator William E. Jenner
 South Dakota Senator Tim Johnson
 Florida Senator George LeMieux

U.S. House of Representatives
 Speaker of the House and vice presidential candidate Wisconsin Representative Paul Ryan (1999–2019) ; Speaker (2015–2019)
 Speaker of the House Missouri Representative Champ Clark (1893–1895; 1897–1921); Speaker (1911–1919)
 California Representative C. Christopher Cox (1988–2002)
 Kentucky Representative Ernie Fletcher (1999–2003)
 Texas Representative Kent Hance (1979–1985)
 Mississippi Representative Henry L. Muldrow (1877–1885)
 Ohio Representative Donald J. Pease (1977–1993)
 California Representative Harley Rouda (2019-2021)
 Kentucky Representative Ed Whitfield (1995–2016)

Other federal officials
 Former Director of the Bureau of Investigation A. Bruce Bielaski
 Ramsey Clark, US Attorney General, 1967-1969
 U.S. Securities and Exchange Commission Chairman Christopher Cox
 White House Press Secretary Marlin Fitzwater
 U.S. Ambassador to China Nelson T. Johnson
 U.S. District Court of Appeals for the District of Columbia Judge George MacKinnon
 New Mexico Governor and U.S. Secretary of Energy Bill Richardson
 John W. Snow, US Secretary of the Treasury, 2003-2006
 Stuart Jamieson Fuller, Vice Consul to Hong Kong, Italy, Sweden, Consul to Peru, Consul General in China.

Meritorious Federal Employees
 Timothy J. McCarthy, U.S. Secret Service Agent shot while protecting President Reagan in 1981

Foreign
 James Jerome, Canadian Speaker of the House of Commons, 1974–1979

State
 Reubin Askew, Governor of Florida, 1971-1979
 James J. Blanchard, Governor of Michigan, 1983-1991
 Ernie Fletcher, Governor of Kentucky, 2003-2007
 Brad Henry, Governor of Oklahoma
 Bruce Johnson, Lieutenant Governor of Ohio
 Adam McMullen, Governor of Nebraska
 Arthur J. Weaver, Governor of Nebraska
 Steve Beshear, Governor of Kentucky, 2007-2015
 Adam Edelen, Kentucky State Auditor
 Todd Hollenbach, Kentucky State Treasurer
 James Mann, Illinois Representative
 Greg Abbott, Governor of Texas

Municipal
 Michael Sessions, Hillsdale, Michigan Mayor
 William "Bill" Soards II, Hamilton County, IN Council Member
 O.W. Williams, Pecos County, Texas County Judge
Rick Rector, Hudson, New York  Mayor, Common Council Member

Academics
 Hank Brown, former Senator and former President of the University of Colorado
 Ralph Cicerone, President of National Academy of Sciences
 Kent Hance, Chancellor of Texas Tech University
 Martin C. Jischke, President of Purdue University
 Jay Keasling, 2006 Discover magazine Scientist of the Year
 William English "Brit" Kirwan, Chancellor of the University of Maryland System
 Peter Likins, former President of The University of Arizona
 Joseph Rallo, President of Angelo State University
 Michael D. Shonrock, former President of Lindenwood University

Artists and entertainment industry
 Actor Robert Armstrong
 Writer and producer Greg Berlanti
 Sculptor and artist Alexander Calder
 Actor, host, and comedian Drew Carey
 Actor, comedian Chip Chinery
 Film director Fielder Cook
 Writer and producer Carter Covington
 Actor Timothy J. Cox
 Actor Bill Fagerbakke
 Actor Will Ferrell
 Actor Frederic Forrest
 Director-screenwriter Stephen Gaghan
 Actor Joel Higgins
 Comedian Eddie Ifft
 Actor and author Jeremy Iversen
 Actor Roy Jenson
 Actor Aron Kincaid
 Film producer Jim Lemley
 Actor Thad Luckinbill
 Actor James Marsden
 Actor Matthew McConaughey
 Actor Austin Miller
 Actor Jim Nabors
 Reality Television Anthony Bartolotte
 Tony Award-winning director Jack O'Brien
 Actor Ed O'Neill
 Actor David Schwimmer
 Actor Jarel Settles
 Actor Johnny Sheffield
 Actor David Sullivan

Music
 Oak Ridge Boys vocalist Duane Allen
 Country singer Keith Anderson
 R.E.M. lead guitarist Peter Buck
 John Denver, Grammy award winning musician
 Bread lead vocalist David Gates
 Restless Heart guitarist Greg Jennings
 Craig Klein, co-founder of Bonerama, a brass funk rock band
 Eddie Reeves singer, songwriter & record executive
 Singer Al Staehely
 Dog's Eye View singer Peter Stuart

Astronauts
 M. Scott Carpenter
 Ken Mattingly

Business and philanthropy
 John Arrillaga, real estate (worth $1.4 billion), Stanford University
 Former SMS Construction and Mining Systems, Inc. and Komatsu Canada Limited CIO, William Bayer
 Attorney Melvin Belli
 Columbia Sportswear President Tim Boyle
 Edelbrock CEO and President Vic Edelbrock, Jr.
 Cintas founder Richard T. Farmer
 Tom Gegax, entrepreneur, author, angel investor and philanthropist
 Hardee's Restaurants Chairman Jack Laughery
 Attorney William Lerach, University of Pittsburgh
 Chris Meek, Vice President of Goldman Sachs
 Paul Rosso, president and chairman of the board of Sumitomo 3M, a joint venture of 3M and Sumitomo Group
 Dun & Bradstreet Credibility Corp CEO Jeff Stibel
 JCPenney CEO Myron E. Ullman
 America's Second Harvest Food Bank founder John van Hengel
 Former CEO of General Motors Richard Wagoner
 Former Chairman of General Motors Edward Whitacre, Jr.; also former CEO of SBC
 The Wharf (Holdings) Limited Chairman Peter Woo
 Henry Juszkiewicz CEO of Gibson Guitar
 Noah Swanson Founder of Swansonists and philanthropist

Military
 Archibald Butt, military advisor to Presidents Teddy Roosevelt and Taft; victim of RMS Titanic sinking
 Marcus Luttrell, Navy SEAL; author of the book Lone Survivor
 Morgan Luttrell, Navy SEAL; congressional candidate in TX-8th congressional district; Twin brother of Marcus Luttrell

Print and journalism
 ABC-TV reporter Dan Abrams
 Political commentator Andrew Breitbart
 Mythology writer Joseph Campbell
 [Red Hat]/Fedora Unleashed co-author Hoyt Duff
 Max Ehrmann
 Forrest Gump author Winston Groom
 NBC-TV reporter Bob Dotson
 Fox News host Bill Hemmer of America's Newsroom
 Novelist John D. MacDonald
 Harper's editor and author Willie Morris
 Television journalist and broadcaster Roger Mudd
 Author Richard North Patterson
 Journalist and World War II war correspondent Quentin Reynolds
 The New Republic founder Willard Straight
 Former NYC PR man and amateur cartoonist Bob Wilson
 ESPN-SEC/CBS/Atlanta Journal/Constitution – Book author, Sports writer and reporter, columnist/College Football TV analyst "Mr. College Football" Tony Barnhart

Religion
 Episcopal bishop Alfred A. Gilman
 Methodist bishop Marshall Russell Reed

Sports

Baseball

 Rubén Amaro Jr.
 Mike Aldrete
 Buddy Bell
 Steve Buechele
 Shawn Green, Major League Baseball (MLB) two-time All-Star right fielder
 Rick Helling
 A. J. Hinch, Houston Astros manager and World Series champion in 2017
 Paul Kuhr
 Mark Marquess, head coach at Stanford University
 Dave McCarty
 J. Walter Miller, MLB pitcher 1924–1933
 Russ Miller, MLB pitcher 1927–1928
 Mike Mussina
 Branch Rickey
 Branch Rickey III, President of the Pacific Coast League
 Eppa Rixey
 Bo Schultz
 George Sisler
 Ed Sprague
 Drew Storen

Basketball
 Jim Andrews
 Mike Bratz
 Pete Carril, former coach, Princeton University
 Michael Cherney
 Scott Drew, coach, Baylor University
 Rich Falk, former coach of the Northwestern Wildcats; Associate Commissioner of the Big Ten Conference
 Aaron Gray
 Ward Lambert
 Bobby Leonard
 Ray Mears winningest coach in University of Tennessee history
 Charles Murphy
 Ed Nealy
 Andy Phillip
 Mike Phillips
 Rick Robey

Football

 Joe Avezzano
 Randy Bullock
 Carmen Cozza
 Irby "Rabbit" Curry, All-Southern quarterback shot down over French skies in World War I
 Chris Dalman, former San Francisco 49ers offensive lineman and later offensive line coach
 Boyd Dowler
 John Elway
 Jason Fisk
 Cale Gundy, Assistant Coach at the University of Oklahoma
 Les Horvath
 Chad Hutchinson
 Frank Juhan
 Dante Lavelli
 Alphonse "Tuffy" Leemans
 Erik Lorig
 John Lynch
 Owen Marecic
 Herb McCracken
 Tot McCullough
 Howard Mudd
 Jess Neely, Captain of 1922 Vanderbilt Commodores football team; winningest coach in Rice history; member of College Football Hall of Fame
 Kent Nix
 Jim Parady, coach at Marist College
 Jim Plunkett
 Jon Ritchie
 Mark Rypien
 Jeff Siemon Minnesota Vikings 4X ProBowl College Football HOF
 Billy Joe Tolliver  
 Jeff Voris, coach at Butler University
 Gene Washington, Former NFL player, and from 1994 to 2009, the Director of Football Operations for the NFL.
 Dave Wyman

Horse racing
 Horse owner and breeder John W. Galbreath
 Horse owner Bob Lewis
 Horse owner and trainer John T. Ward, Jr.

Other sports

 Andy Banachowski, women's volleyball coach at UCLA
 Bruce Barnes
 Scott Dunlap
 Ludy Langer
 Todd Martin
 Mark Mendelblatt, yachtsman, three-time college All-American, silver medalist at Pan American Games, silver medalist at Laser World Championships
 Al Oerter, four-time Olympic Champion in discus throw
 Jay Randolph
 Kyle Rote, Jr.
 Roy Saari
 Anthony Valentino

Sportscasters
 Steve Bunin
 Bill Flemming
 Bill Macatee
 Jon Miller
 Pat O'Brien
 Jay Randolph
 Jon Ritchie
 Craig Sager

References

External links
 

Members
Delta Tau Delta